is a former Japanese football player. He played for Japan national team.

Club career
Katsuya was educated at and played for Shimabara Commerce High School and Osaka University of Commerce. After graduating in 1984, he joined Japan Soccer League side Honda. He was selected Best Eleven in 1985–86 and 1986–87. But he moved to fellow JSL side Nissan Motors (later Yokohama Marinos) in 1991. He was transferred to Júbilo Iwata in 1994, then to Cerezo Osaka in 1998, and retired from the game at the end of the 1998 season.

National team career
In September 1985, Katsuya was selected Japan national team for 1986 World Cup qualification. At this qualification, on September 22, he debuted against Hong Kong. He also played 1986 Asian Games and 1988 Summer Olympics qualification in 1987.

In 1992, Katsuya was selected Japan for the first time in 5 years. He was a member of the Japan won the 1992 Asian Cup. He played 3 matches in the competition. In 1993, he was also selected Japan for 1994 World Cup qualification. At this qualification, he filled in for injured left back Satoshi Tsunami in the Final round. He was on the pitch when Japan's hope to play in the finals was dashed by an injury-time Iraqi equaliser in the last qualifier, the match that the Japanese fans now refer to as the Agony of Doha. This qualification was his last game for Japan. He played 27 games for Japan until 1993.

Futsal career
In 1989, Katsuya selected Japan national futsal team for 1989 Futsal World Championship in Netherlands.

Coaching career
After retirement, Katsuya started coaching career at Cerezo Osaka in 1999. He mainly served as coach and scout.

Club statistics

National team statistics

Honors and awards

Team Honors
 1992 Asian Cup (Champions)

References

External links
 
 Japan National Football Team Database
 

1961 births
Living people
Osaka University of Commerce alumni
Association football people from Nagasaki Prefecture
Japanese footballers
Japan international footballers
Japan Soccer League players
J1 League players
Honda FC players
Yokohama F. Marinos players
Júbilo Iwata players
Cerezo Osaka players
Footballers at the 1986 Asian Games
1992 AFC Asian Cup players
AFC Asian Cup-winning players
Association football defenders
Asian Games competitors for Japan